The 1994 Paris–Roubaix was the 92nd running of the Paris–Roubaix single-day cycling race, often known as the Hell of the North.

It was won by Andrei Tchmil, at the age of 31. It was his first and only victory in the "Hell of the North". Tchmil won alone, with an advantage of more than a minute in front of Italians Fabio Baldato and Franco Ballerini, who rounded out the podium. The winner of the previous edition, Gilbert Duclos-Lassalle, was only 7th now.

Results
10-04-1994: Compiègne–Roubaix, 270 km.

References

1994
1994 in road cycling
1994 in French sport
Paris-Roubaix
April 1994 sports events in Europe